The following is the list of institutions started by/affiliated to Ramakrishna Mission.

 
As of 7 March 2022, the Ramakrishna Mission and Ramakrishna Math have 265 centres all over the world: 198 in India, 26 in Bangladesh, 14 in the United States, 2 each in Brazil, Canada, Russia, South Africa and one each in Argentina, Australia, Fiji, France, Germany, Ireland, Japan, Malaysia, Mauritius, Nepal, Netherlands, Philippines, Singapore, Sri Lanka, Switzerland, UK, and Zambia. Besides, there are 44 sub-centres (14 within India, 30 outside India) under different centres.
The Math and Mission run 748 educational institutions (including 12 colleges, 22 higher secondary schools, 41 secondary schools, 135 schools of other grades, 4 polytechnics, 48 vocational training centres, 118 hostels, 7 orphanages, etc.) with a total student population of more than 2,00,000.
Besides these branch centres, there are about one thousand unaffiliated centres (popularly called 'private centres') all over the world started by the devotees and followers of Sri Ramakrishna and Swami Vivekananda.

The centres of the Ramakrishna Order outside India fall into two broad categories. In countries such as Bangladesh, Nepal, Sri Lanka, Fiji and Mauritius, the nature of service activities is very much similar to India (which is humanitarianism and spirituality). In other parts of the world, especially in Europe, Canada, United States, Japan, and Australia, the work is mostly confined to the preaching of Vedanta, the publication of books and journals and personal guidance in spiritual matters. Many of the centres outside India are called as the 'Vedanta Society' or 'Vedanta Centre'.

India

West Bengal

Educational institutions

Baranagore Ramakrishna Mission Ashrama High School, Baranagar, Dist.: North 24 Parganas, West Bengal 

Ramakrishna Mission Centenary Primary School, Baranagore, Baranagar, WB 
Taki Ramakrishna Mission High School, Taki, District: North 24 Parganas, West Bengal
Asansol Ramakrishna Mission High School, Asansol, District: West Burdwan, West Bengal
Ramharipur Ramakrishna Mission High School, Ramharipur, Dist.: Bankura
Ramakrishna Mission Vivekananda Vidyamandir, Malda

Ramakrishna Mission Vivekananda Centenary College, Rahara, District: North 24 Parganas, WB
Ramakrishna Mission Calcutta Students' Home, Belgharia, District: North 24 Parganas 

Ramakrishna Mission Vidyalaya, Narendrapur, WB

Ramakrishna Mission Residential College, Narendrapur, WB 

Ramakrishna Mission Siksha Mandir, Sarisha, Sarisha, District: South 24 Parganas, WB 
Ramakrishna Mission Vidyamandira, Belur Math, District: Howrah, WB

Ramakrishna Mission Shikshanamandira, Belur Math, District: Howrah, WB
Ramakrishna Mission Shilpayatana (I.T.I. & Higher Secondary Vocational),  Belur Math, District: Howrah, WB
Ramakrishna Mission Vidyabhaban, Midnapore
Ramakrishna Mission Multipurpose School, Kamarpukur, WB
Rahara Ramakrishna Mission Boys' Home High School (H.S.), District: North 24 Parganas, WB

Ramakrishna Mission Vidyapith, Purulia, West Bengal

 Sargachi Ramakrishna Mission High School, Sargachi, Murshidabad, West Bengal

 Ramakrishna Mission Institute of Culture, Golpark, Kolkata

 Nimpith Ramakrishna Mission Ashrama, Jaynagar, District: South 24 Parganas, WB
 Ramakrishna Mission Sarada Vidyapith, Jayrambati, Bankura

 Ramakrishna Mission Vivekananda Educational and Research Institute, Belur

Other institutions
 Belur Math (headquarters of Ramakrishna Mission), Belur, Howrah

 Baranagar Math, Baranagar (first monastery of Ramakrishna Order) 
 Alambazar Math, Baranagar (second monastery of Ramakrishna Order) 

 Garden House (Udyan Bati), Cossipore, Kolkata 
 Ramakrishna Mission Seva Pratishthan, Vivekananda Institute of Medical Sciences, Kolkata
 Ramakrishna Stadium, Narendrapur

 Roy Villa, Darjeeling

 Balaram Mandir, Baghbazar, Kolkata
 Ramakrishna Mission Sevashrama, Sargachi

 Ramakrishna Mission Swami Vivekananda's Ancestral House and Cultural Centre, Kolkata
 Ramakrishna Sarada Math, Baghbazar

 House of Sister Nivedita, Baghbazar
 Shyampukur Bati, Shyampukur, Kolkata

Chhattisgarh
Ramakrishna Mission Ashrama Narainpur, Chhattisgarh

Bihar
 Katihar Ramakrishna Mission Vidyamandir, Bihar

Jharkhand
 Ramakrishna Mission Vidyapith, Deoghar, Jharkhand 
 Ramakrishna Mission School, Sidhgora Jamshedpur
 Vivekananda Vidya Mandir, Ranchi

Uttar Pradesh

Educational institutions
 Ramakrishna Mission Ashrama, Kanpur, Uttar Pradesh

Other institutions
 Ramakrishna Mission Home of Service, Varanasi
 Sri Ramakrishna Math, Lucknow
 Vivekananda Polyclinic and Institute of Medical Sciences, Lucknow

Tamil Nadu

Educational institutions
 Ramakrishna Mission Students Home Chennai, Mylapore, Chennai, Tamil Nadu 
 Ramakrishna Mission Vivekananda College, Mylapore, Chennai, Tamil Nadu 
 Sri Ramakrishna Mission Higher Secondary School, T. Nagar, Chennai
 Sri RKM Sarada Vidyalaya Girls Higher Secondary School, T. Nagar, Chennai
 Ramakrishna Mission Vidyalaya, Coimbatore
 Ramakrishna Vidyalaya Matriculation Higher Secondary School, Villupuram
 Sri Ramakrishna Mission Vidyalaya Polytechnic College, Coimbatore

Other institutions
 Sri Ramakrishna Math, Chennai
 Vivekanandar Illam, Chennai
 Vivekananda Rock Memorial, Kanyakumari

Kerala

Educational institutions
 Shree Ramakrishna Mission Maharani School, Panniyankara, Kozhikode, Calicut, Kerala

Other institutions
 Ramakrishna Math, Thrissur

Andhra Pradesh

Educational institutions
 Ramakrishna Mission High School, Maharanipeta, Visakhapatnam, Andhra Pradesh

Other institutions
 Ramakrishna Mission Beach, Visakhapatnam

Karnataka

Educational institutions
 Sri Ramakrishna Vidyarthi Mandiram, Bangalore
 Sri Ramakrishna Vidyashala, Mysore, Karnataka 
 Vivekananda Balaka Sangha, Bangalore
 Ramakrishna Institute of Moral & Spiritual Education, Mysore

Other institutions
 Ramakrishna Math, Ulsoor, Bangalore
Ramakrishna Math, Basavanagudi, Bangalore
 Sri Ramakrishna Ashram, Yadavagiri, Mysore
 Sri Ramakrishna Math and Mission, Mangaladevi, Mangalore
 Ramakrishna Sharadashram, Ponnampet, Kodagu
Ramakrishna Mission, Shivanahalli
Ramakrishna Mission Ashrama, Belagavi
Ramakrishna Mission, Davangere
Ramakrishna Math, Madihalli

Arunachal Pradesh

Educational institutions
 Ramakrishna Mission School, Viveknagar, Along, Dist.: West Siang, Arunachal Pradesh 
 Ramakrishna Mission School, Narottamnagar http://www.rkmnarottamnagar.org/
Ramakrishna Mission School, Lumdung, Seppa 790102, Arunachal Pradesh,

Other institutions
 Ramakrishna Mission Hospital, Ganga, Itanagar

Tripura
Ramakrishna Mahavidyalaya, Kailasahar, Tripura
 Ramakrishna Mission Vidyalaya, Viveknagar, Agartala

Uttarakhand
 Advaita Ashrama, Dist. Champawat, Uttarakhand 
 Ramakrishna Mission Sevashrama, Kankhal, Haridwar, Uttarakhand

Odisha
 Ramakrishna Math and Mission, Bhubaneswar, Bhubaneswar, Odisha

Delhi
 Ramakrishna Mission, Delhi

Bangladesh

Educational institutions 
 Ramakrishna Temple and Ramkrishna Mission, Dhaka

Other institutions 
Ramakrishna Sevashram Chittagong.
Ramkrishna Math, Barisal.
Ramakrishna Math, Sylhet.

Sri Lanka
 R. K. M. Sri Koneswara Hindu College
Kokuvil Ramakrishna M.V, Sri Lanka
Kondavil Hindu Maha Vidyalayam, Sri Lanka
Kondavil Ramakrishna Vidyalayam, Sri Lanka

United States
 Ramakrishna-Vivekananda Center, New York
 Vedanta Society of New York
 Vedanta Society of Providence, Providence, Rhode Island
 Vivekananda Vedanta Society of Chicago, Illinois

 Vedanta Society of Connecticut, Canton, Connecticut,
 Vedanta Society of Southern California, Los Angeles, California

 Ramakrishna Vedanta Society, Boston

Singapore
 Ramakrishna Mission, Singapore

Gallery

References

External links

 Official website 
 About Ramakrishna Math and Ramakrishna Mission

Ramakrishna Mission
Ramakrishna Mission institutions